Electoral district no. 4 is one of the 12 multi-member electoral districts of the Riigikogu, the national legislature of Estonia. The district was established as electoral district no. 5 in 1992 when the Riigikogu was re-established following Estonia's independence from the Soviet Union. It was renamed electoral district no. 4 in 1995 following the re-organisation of electoral districts. It is conterminous with the counties of Harju (excluding Tallinn which has its own electoral districts) and Rapla. The district currently elects 15 of the 101 members of the Riigikogu using the open party-list proportional representation electoral system. At the 2019 parliamentary election it had 133,437 registered electors.

Electoral system
Electoral district no. 4 currently elects 15 of the 101 members of the Riigikogu using the open party-list proportional representation electoral system. The allocation of seats is carried out in three stages. In the first stage, any individual candidate, regardless of whether they are a party or independent candidate, who receives more votes than the district's simple quota (Hare quota: valid votes in district/number of seats allocated to district) is elected via a personal mandate. In the second stage, district mandates are allocated to parties by dividing their district votes by the district's simple quota. Only parties that reach the 5% national threshold compete for district mandates and any personal mandates won by the party are subtracted from the party's district mandates. Prior to 2003 if a party's surplus/remainder votes was equal to or greater than 75% of the district's simple quota it received one additional district mandate. Any unallocated district seats are added to a national pool of compensatory seats. In the final stage, compensatory mandates are calculated based on the national vote and using a modified D'Hondt method. Only parties that reach the 5% national threshold compete for compensatory seats and any personal and district mandates won by the party are subtracted from the party's compensatory mandates. Though calculated nationally, compensatory mandates are allocated at the district level.

Seats
Seats allocated to electoral district no. 4 by the National Electoral Committee of Estonia at each election was as follows:
 2023 - 16
 2019 - 15
 2015 - 14
 2011 - 14
 2007 - 13
 2003 - 12
 1999 - 12
 1995 - 11
 1992 - 10

Election results

Summary

(Excludes compensatory seats)

Detailed

2023
Results of the 2023 parliamentary election held on 5 March 2023:

The following candidates were elected:
 Personal mandates - Kaja Kallas (REF), 31,816 votes; and Jüri Ratas (KESK), 7,672 votes.
 District mandates - Lauri Hussar (EE200), 3,343 votes; Marina Kaljurand (SDE), 4,145 votes;  Urmas Reinsalu (IE), 4,509 votes; Marko Mihkelson (REF), 2,640 votes; Mario Kadastik (REF), 962 votes; Siim Pohlak (EKRE), 4,223 votes;  Henn Põlluaas (EKRE), 5,781 votes; Aivar Sõerd (REF), 1,248 votes; Timo Suslov (REF), 1,033 votes; Kristina Šmigun-Vähi (REF), 1,005 votes; Toomas Uibo (EE200), 2,420 votes;.
 Compensatory mandates -  Rene Kokk (EKRE), 1,016 votes; and Mart Võrklaev (REF), 908 votes.

2019
Results of the 2019 parliamentary election held on 3 March 2019:

The following candidates were elected:
 Personal mandates - Kaja Kallas (RE), 20,072 votes; Henn Põlluaas (EKRE), 7,390 votes; and Jüri Ratas (K), 9,702 votes.
 District mandates - Vladimir Arhipov (K), 944 votes; Marina Kaljurand (SDE), 5,504 votes; Rene Kokk (EKRE), 1,458 votes; Jüri Luik (I), 4,806 votes; Marko Mihkelson (RE), 3,655 votes; Madis Milling (RE), 2,310 votes; Kalle Palling (RE), 1,655 votes; Siim Pohlak (EKRE), 4,152 votes; and Aivar Sõerd (RE), 2,476 votes.
 Compensatory mandates - Paul Puustusmaa (EKRE), 419 votes.

2015
Results of the 2015 parliamentary election held on 1 March 2015:

The following candidates were elected:
 Personal mandates - Jüri Ratas (K), 7,932 votes; Taavi Rõivas (RE), 15,881 votes; and Artur Talvik (EVA), 7,308 votes.
 District mandates - Yoko Alender (RE), 2,715 votes; Marko Mihkelson (IRL), 2,842 votes; Sven Mikser (SDE), 4,969 votes; Madis Milling (RE), 2,580 votes; Kalle Palling (RE), 1,917 votes; Juhan Parts (IRL), 4,208 votes; Henn Põlluaas (EKRE), 4,309 votes; Aivar Sõerd (RE), 2,047 votes; and Vladimir Velman (K), 1,294 votes.
 Compensatory mandates - Urve Palo (SDE), 2,028 votes; and Laine Randjärv (RE), 1,698 votes.

2011
Results of the 2011 parliamentary election held on 6 March 2011:

The following candidates were elected:
 Personal mandates - Andrus Ansip (RE), 18,967 votes; Kaja Kallas (RE), 7,153 votes; and Mart Laar (IRL), 9,541 votes.
 District mandates - Aare Heinvee (RE), 1,017 votes; Jüri Jaanson (RE), 1,178 votes; Marko Mihkelson (IRL), 3,943 votes; Kalle Palling (RE), 1,549 votes; Urve Palo (SDE), 5,875 votes; Mailis Reps (K), 2,639 votes; Aivar Riisalu (K), 2,189 votes; Reet Roos (IRL), 848 votes; and Karel Rüütli (SDE), 1,470 votes.
 Compensatory mandates - Kalev Lillo (RE), 474 votes; and Vladimir Velman (K), 2,016 votes.

2007
Results of the 2007 parliamentary election held on 4 March 2007:

The following candidates were elected:
 Personal mandates - Andrus Ansip (RE), 22,540 votes.
 District mandates - Marko Mihkelson (IRL), 2,697 votes; Harri Õunapuu (RE), 962 votes; Siiri Oviir (K), 3,643 votes; Kalle Palling (RE), 714 votes; Mailis Reps (K), 3,000 votes; Rain Rosimannus (RE), 1,177 votes; Jaak Salumets (RE), 597 votes; Marek Strandberg (EER), 5668 votes; Liina Tõnisson (SDE), 2,363 votes; and Taavi Veskimägi (IRL), 5,790 votes.
 Compensatory mandates - Valdur Lahtvee (EER), 475 votes.

2003
Results of the 2003 parliamentary election held on 2 March 2003:

The following candidates were elected:
 Personal mandates - Siim Kallas (RE), 10,008 votes; and Taavi Veskimägi (ÜVE-RP), 6,020 votes.
 District mandates - Tunne-Väldo Kelam (I), 2,808 votes; Leino Mägi (RE), 520 votes; Harri Õunapuu (K), 1,918 votes; Reet Roos (ÜVE-RP), 3,096 votes; Rain Rosimannus (RE), 600 votes; Tiit Tammsaar (ERL), 1,674 votes; Andres Tarand (RM), 2,356 votes; Liina Tõnisson (K), 3,643 votes; and Ülo Vooglaid (ÜVE-RP), 1,719 votes.
 Compensatory mandates - Värner Lootsmann (K), 295 votes; and Henn Pärn (ÜVE-RP), 946 votes.

1999
Results of the 1999 parliamentary election held on 7 March 1999:

The following candidates were elected:
 Personal mandates - Toivo Asmer (RE), 5,590 votes; and Andres Tarand (M), 11,112 votes.
 District mandates - Jürgen Ligi (RE), 1,025 votes; Harri Õunapuu (K), 4,137 votes; Jaana Padrik (I), 4,299 votes; Viive Rosenberg (K), 2,508 votes; and Jüri Tamm (M), 471 votes.
 Compensatory mandates - Sirje Endre (I), 577 votes; and Arvo Sirendi (KE), 939 votes.

1995
Results of the 1995 parliamentary election held on 5 March 1995:

The following candidates were elected:
 Personal mandates - Andres Tarand (M), 11,422 votes.
 District mandates - Lembit Arro (KMÜ), 2,480 votes; Rein Karemäe (K), 2,802 votes; Paul-Eerik Rummo (RE), 4,592 votes; Arvo Sirendi (KMÜ), 5,233 votes; and Ülo Vooglaid (KMÜ), 4,202 votes.
 Compensatory mandates - Olav Anton (K), 1,590 votes.

1992
Results of the 1992 parliamentary election held on 20 September 1992:

The following candidates were elected:
 Personal mandates - Mart Laar (I), 7,631 votes.
 District mandates - Lembit Arro (KK), 3,305 votes; Jaanus Betlem (I), 524 votes; Vambola Põder (SK), 4,153 votes; and Andres Tarand (M), 3,122 votes.
 Compensatory mandates - Olav Anton (R), 814 votes; Jaak Herodes (M), 423 votes; Karin Jaani (I), 277 votes; Rein Kikerpill (SK), 394 votes; Ivar Raig (M), 1,883 votes; Vardo Rumessen (ERSP), 816 votes; Arvo Sirendi (KK), 2,559 votes; and Ülo Vooglaid (KK), 1,414 votes.

References

Riigikogu electoral district
Riigikogu electoral district
04
04